(Sex) Appeal (Taiwan: ,) is a 2014 Taiwanese-Chinese youth romance drama film directed by Wang Wei-ming. It was released in Taiwan and China on October 24, 2014.

Cast
Vivian Hsu as Fang An-yu
Alyssa Chia as Lin An-ni
Amber Kuo as Pai Hui-hua
Leon Dai as Li Jen-fang
Jade Chou as Wang Wen-hui
Sean Huang
Lene Lai as Li Ya
Fion Fu as Fu Hsiao-ling

Reception

Critical response
On Film Business Asia, Derek Elley gave it a 7 out of 10, calling it a "notable, if over-dense, drama centred on a teacher-student "rape" [that] raises the Taiwan bar."

Accolades

References

External links

2014 romantic drama films
Taiwanese romantic drama films
Chinese romantic drama films
2010s Mandarin-language films